Dialgaye is a department of Kouritenga Province in eastern Burkina Faso. Its capital lies at the town of Dialgaye. According to the 2006 census the department has a total population of 36,893.

Towns and villages
 Dialgaye (3,354 inhabitants) (capital)
 Boulga (2,115 inhabitants) 
 Dagamtenga Peulh (180 inhabitants) 
 Dagamtenga (2,393 inhabitants) 
 Dassoui (4,231 inhabitants) 
 Gomtenga (2,617 inhabitants) 
 Issiri Yaoguin (2,048 inhabitants) 
 Kalmodo (529 inhabitants) 
 Kalwenga (609 inhabitants) 
 Kampoayargo (853 inhabitants) 
 Kidibin (678 inhabitants) 
 Kostenga (896 inhabitants) 
 Lioulgou (2,482 inhabitants) 
 Lioulgou-Peulh (838 inhabitants) 
 Loanga (351 inhabitants) 
 Nabdogo (248 inhabitants) 
 Neneogo (2,194 inhabitants) 
 Ouarghin (1,107 inhabitants) 
 Passem-Noguin (1,653 inhabitants) 
 Songpelcé (500 inhabitants) 
 Tamissi (525 inhabitants) 
 Ténoaghin (1,297 inhabitants) 
 Toesse-Koulba (815 inhabitants) 
 Vongo (388 inhabitants) 
 Yélembasse (669 inhabitants) 
 Zeguedega (1,786 inhabitants) 
 Zeguedega Poessé (1,537 inhabitants)

Demographics

References

Departments of Burkina Faso
Kouritenga Province